Jenny Dearborn is an author, former chief talent officer and vice president at the software company, SAP, and founded Actionable Analytics Group in 2014. While working at SAP, she was acknowledged as one of the top 50 most powerful women in tech and won the title of Female Executive of the Year in 2017. Her book, Data Driven, ranked 7th out of the 11,000 business books published in 2015.

Born and raised in California, Dearborn kicked off her career as a classroom instructor in the employee Learning and Development department at Hewlett Giant.

Dearborn is a pioneer of computer education and an advocate for people with disabilities, female involvement and gender equality in the technology industry, and emphasizes building the skills of individuals in a team.

She is part of many organizations as she is also on the Board of Directors for the Association for Talent Development, Plum, TheatreWorks and the Commonwealth Club. With her involvements, she is able to stay involved in several communities.

Family and education

Early life 
Dearborn was born in Marin, California, but she and her family soon moved to Davis, California where she received K-12 education. Dearborn’s interest in special disabilities came from her personal experiences. At her school, she was placed into special education classes due to her learning disability, dyslexia, which was left undiagnosed throughout these years. As a result, she could not read basic language content until sixth grade. Her ADHD also prompted more learning challenges in terms of concentration and reprimands from the staff who insulted her and forced her to run around the school.  At the age of 18, she was officially diagnosed with severe dyslexia, ADHD, and mild OCD. Her diagnosis sparked a desire within her to transform the education system in order to prevent other children with similar challenges from going through the same frustrations she did. Eventually, Dearborn learned to overcome her learning difficulties by absorbing content through audio instead of text and transformed her inability to concentrate into an efficient method for multitasking. At first, Dearborn made the decision to hide her disabilities due to fears of social judgement and negative stereotypes impacting her progress and efforts in the workplace. Even though she was affected by the stigma around her conditions, she sought out to disprove these stereotypes. She later made the decision to reveal her disabilities when she was in a higher position in order to encourage others similar to her to not feel limited by their identity and personal challenges. Now, she acts as an activist and mentor for those with similar disabilities and desires to communicate that there is hope for success even with these challenges.

Education 
Dearborn graduated from Davis High School in 1987 and went on to complete an associate degree in Social Sciences from American River College in 1989. She was accepted into University of California, Berkeley where she completed her Bachelors of Arts in English in 1991. Dearborn completed her Masters in Education at Stanford University in 1993 and went on to complete an MBA in Organizational Development in 2003.

Career

Early career 
Dearborn began her professional career at Woodside High School as an English, Drama, and Public Speaking teacher. Due to her teaching job being at dissonance with her personality and goals, she decided to transition to a career which aimed at greater social change through education. She found that opportunity at IT giant, Hewlett Packard, where she was hired as a classroom instructor in the Employee Learning and Development department in 1995 and remained in the company for 20 years. Later on, Dearborn also worked at Sun Microsystems as the Chief Learning Architect and served as the Chief Learning Officer at Success Factors which finally paved her way to being hired at SAP.

SAP 
Following the acquisition of Success Factors by SAP Software Solutions, a worldwide company that provides technological services for managing business and customers, Dearborn introduced herself to the CEO and was successfully appointed as their Chief Learning Officer. As the newly hired CLO, her task was to ensure that all the company’s untrained managers cost-effectively received proper instructions. Being the CLO and Senior Vice President of SAP, Jenny Dearborn had to draft strategy and education programs for 95,000 employees worldwide, analyze their abilities, and address areas where training was necessary.

As the CLO, Dearborn transformed SAP’s gender awareness seminars, which were in place for accommodating the rights of female employees and opted for the creation of a more efficient program called the Leadership Excellence Acceleration Program (LEAP). LEAP gathered a group of promising female candidates who fulfilled the criteria for job advancement and placed them into a year-long course which enhanced their networks and skills as risk-takers and leaders.

While also at SAP, she worked with the company to fund school and college programs for STEM instruction and preparing. SAP also manage a University Alliance Program consisting of 500 U.S. establishments and more whose main goal is on places that are lowly prepared in computer education. The program uses Project Propel and six-year tech secondary school activities as well as coding projects that pushes these youthful understudies to further their understanding and knowledge of STEM instruction. Giving out 2.5 million dollars a year to NGOs, Dearborn felt proud that she and SAP were able to use this money to support the continuation of the STEM program for students.

The Prism Award from the International Coaching Federation accredited Dearborn's coaching strategies in 2015, and her project crew received the top spot internationally incorporate learning departments from the eLearning Magazine.

Current occupation 
Dearborn left SAP and opened her own company called Actionable Analytics Group in 2019. In August 2020, Jenny joined a hyper-growth Boston Based Start-Up called Klaviyo as its Chief People Officer. She also runs various other independent companies whose primary goal is to assist organizations with boosting representative efficiency and execution. Dearborn contributes in the Forbes San Francisco Business Council, an association for effective business visionaries and pioneers in San Francisco.

Books and other works 
Dearborn is author of Data Driven: How Performance Analytics Delivers Extraordinary Sales Results (2015) and The Data Driven Leader (2017). Data Driven is about increasing sales success through analytics and The Data Driven Leader was a guide on how to solve leadership challenges through human resources and other data analytics. Data Driven was ranked 7th out of 11,000 business books published in 2015.

Other accomplishments 
Dearborn has been awarded the Silicon Valley Tribute to Women in Industry Award in 2013 and the Silicon Valley Woman of Influence Award in 2014. She was awarded Female Executive of the Year in 2017 and received the Athena Leadership Award.

References 

American women business executives
21st-century American non-fiction writers
People from Marin County, California
Writers from California
21st-century American women writers
SAP SE people
American River College alumni
University of California, Berkeley alumni
Stanford University alumni
Year of birth missing (living people)
Living people